Kyrgyzstan has participated at the Youth Olympic Games since the inaugural 2010 Games and every edition after that.

Medal tables

Medals by Summer Games

Medals by Winter Games

Medals by summer sport

List of medalists

Summer Games

Summer Games medalists as part of Mixed-NOCs Team

Flag bearers

See also
Kyrgyzstan at the Olympics
Kyrgyzstan at the Paralympics

External links
Kyrgyzstan Olympic Committee

 
Youth sport in Kyrgyzstan
Nations at the Youth Olympic Games